Cambarus harti, the Piedmont blue burrower, is a species of burrowing crayfish in the family Cambaridae. It is endemic to Georgia in the United States. The common name refers to the Piedmont plateau region.

The IUCN conservation status of Cambarus harti is "EN", endangered. The species faces a high risk of extinction in the near future. The IUCN status was reviewed in 2010.

References

Further reading

 
 
 

Cambaridae
Articles created by Qbugbot
Crustaceans described in 1981
Taxa named by Horton H. Hobbs Jr.
Endemic fauna of Georgia (U.S. state)